Langalakhe Nicholas "Senzo" Mkhize (1969/1970 – May 2016) was a South African politician who represented the African National Congress (ANC) in the National Assembly and KwaZulu-Natal Provincial Legislature. Formerly an activist in the ANC Youth League, he served in the National Assembly from 2009 until 2010, when he was transferred to the provincial legislature. He remained in the provincial legislature until his death in 2016 and was its Chief Whip from 2014 onwards. At the time of his death, he was also a member of the Provincial Executive Committee of the ANC's KwaZulu-Natal branch.

Early life and activism 
He was born in Inanda in present-day KwaZulu-Natal (formerly Natal province) in 1969 or 1970. He became active in the anti-apartheid movement while a student at Nkosinathi High School in the 1980s. According to Mxolisi Kaunda, he became active in the United Democratic Front in Inanda through the Inanda Youth Organisation, an affiliate of the South African Youth Congress. 

After the ANC was unbanned in 1990, he became a regional leader of the ANC Youth League, and later of the mainstream ANC, in northern Durban. He ultimately served as Deputy Chairperson of the ANC Youth League's KwaZulu-Natal branch.

Provincial legislature 
In the 2009 general election, Mkhize was elected to an ANC seat in the National Assembly. He held the seat until 2010, when the ANC transferred him to a seat in the KwaZulu-Natal Provincial Legislature. In 2012, he was appointed as the party's Deputy Chief Whip in the provincial legislature. Pursuant to the 2014 general election, he was elected to his first full term in the provincial legislature, ranked 18th on the ANC's provincial party list, and was additionally named as the ANC's Chief Whip in the legislature. 

He was also a member of the Provincial Executive Committee of the ANC's provincial branch in KwaZulu-Natal. Following his election to the body in 2012, he served as provincial spokesperson for the provincial party. He was re-elected to another four-year term on the committee in 2015.

Personal life and death 
Mkhize was married to Nelisiwe, with whom he had five children. After suffering a stroke in 2015, he died in May 2016, aged 46, in hospital in Durban following a long illness. He was buried at Heroes' Acre in Chesterville.

References

External links 

 

Members of the KwaZulu-Natal Legislature
African National Congress politicians
21st-century South African politicians
2016 deaths
Year of birth missing
Members of the National Assembly of South Africa
People from Inanda, KwaZulu-Natal